William Vernon Adams (March 29, 1897 – February 4, 1978) was a Canadian professional ice hockey player. He played with the Regina Capitals of the Western Canada Hockey League, and with the Vancouver Millionaires of the Pacific Coast Hockey Association. He was a younger brother of Hockey Hall of Fame member Jack Adams. William V. Adams died on February 4, 1978, at Florida, United States.

References

External links

1897 births
1978 deaths
Canadian ice hockey left wingers
Ice hockey people from Ontario
Regina Capitals players
Saskatoon Sheiks players
Sportspeople from Thunder Bay
Vancouver Millionaires players